BeBook is a trademark of Endless Ideas, a Dutch manufacturer of e-book readers and tablet computers. The first BeBook device was a rebranding of the Hanlin eReader. They have filed for bankruptcy and have released no new models since, their website has been taken down.

The company offered the following devices:

BeBook Club
BeBook Club S 
BeBook Live
BeBook Mini
Bebook Neo
BeBook One
BeBook Pure
BeBook Touch

In January 2012, Endless Ideas filed for bankruptcy.

References

External links
 

Dedicated ebook devices